League of Hercegovina-Neretva Canton is a fourth level league in the Bosnia and Herzegovina football league system. The league champion is promoted to the Second League of the Federation of Bosnia and Herzegovina - South.

Member clubs
List of clubs competing in 2020–21 season:
 FK Blagaj
 NK Buna
 NK Cim
 FK Iskra Stolac
 HNK Kruševo
 FK Lokomotiva Mostar
 NK Međugorje
 NK Mostar
 NK Sport Talent Mostar
 HNK Višići

References

4
Bos